Estádio Olímpico Pedro Ludovico is a stadium in Goiânia, Brazil. It has a capacity of 13,500 spectators. It is the home of Goiânia. It was one of the stadiums that hosted matches during the 2019 FIFA U-17 World Cup and the 2021 Copa América.

References

Football venues in Goiás
Atlético Clube Goianiense